Qarah Tappeh (also Romanized as Qareh Tappeh; also known as Qaratepe) is a village in Miyan Kaleh Rural District, in the Central District of Behshahr County, Mazandaran Province, Iran. At the 2006 census, its population was 1,884, in 504 families.

References 

Populated places in Behshahr County